Joseph Abiodun Ladapo (born December 16, 1978) is an American physician who is the surgeon general of Florida. He has attracted attention for spreading misinformation on COVID-19 and promoting vaccine hesitancy. 

After immigrating to the United States from Nigeria, Ladapo earned an MD and a PhD in Health Policy from Harvard University; he served as a professor of medicine at New York University before being tenured at the University of California, Los Angeles. During the COVID-19 pandemic, Ladapo promoted unproven treatments, opposed vaccine and mask mandates, questioned the safety of COVID-19 vaccines, and spread miscellaneous falsehoods, contradicting professional medical organizations. Ladapo has also opposed gender-affirming care and counselling for transgender and nonbinary minors.

Early life and education 
Ladapo was born in Nigeria, the son of a microbiologist. He immigrated to the United States at age five along with his family. In his memoir, Ladapo said he had been traumatized by sexual abuse from a babysitter. He earned a Bachelor of Arts degree in chemistry from Wake Forest University in 2000, and was a star athlete. Ladapo received a MD from Harvard Medical School and a PhD in Health Policy from Harvard Graduate School of Arts and Sciences in 2008. Ladapo completed clinical training in internal medicine at Beth Israel Deaconess Medical Center, a teaching hospital of Harvard Medical School.

Career 
After Harvard, Ladapo worked at the NYU School of Medicine, Bellevue Hospital, and Tisch Hospital in New York City. He received tenure at the David Geffen School of Medicine at UCLA, where he was a researcher, seeing patients about one day per week.

COVID-19 pandemic and Florida surgeon generalship 
Around early 2020, Ladapo began to write op-eds for The Wall Street Journal on the emerging COVID-19 pandemic, notwithstanding a lack of specialization in infectious diseases, and gained prominence as a skeptic against the mainstream consensus about modalities of prevention and treatment. In these columns, Ladapo promoted unproven treatments including hydroxychloroquine and ivermectin, questioned the safety of vaccines, and opposed lockdown and mask mandates deriving from his "experience in treating COVID-19 patients at University of California, Los Angeles." However, UCLA's staff scheduling roster did not have him assigned to treat any COVID-19 patients, and several of his colleagues rejected that he had treated any COVID-19 patient. Later that year, Ladapo signed the Great Barrington Declaration, which argued for reaching COVID-19 herd immunity by the fringe notion of "focused protection", where the less vulnerable people were allowed to be infected.

Ladapo's op-eds caught the interest of Florida Governor Ron DeSantis. On September 21, 2021, he was appointed the Surgeon General of the state, replacing Scott Rivkees, pending confirmation by the Florida Senate. Simultaneously, he was appointed an associate professor at the University of Florida Health in a fast-tracked hiring process initiated after the Board of Trustees chair — a DeSantis advisor — presented his resume before the UF Health president. Faculties have since alleged that university administrators suppressed information about Ladapo's views on COVID-19 before the vote on his tenure.

On appointment, Ladapo critiqued the "senseless" fear-driven cult of vaccination — characterizing vaccines as one of the many equally preventative arms of pandemic management — and would repeal quarantine rules for schoolchildren exposed to COVID-19 as his first executive action. The following month, Ladapo refused to wear a mask while meeting State Senator Tina Polsky, who was set to undergo radiation therapy; he defended his actions on the ground that masking hindered effective communication. The Senate confirmed Ladapo on February 23, 2022; during background checks, his former UCLA supervisor refused a positive recommendation and said that Ladapo's "hands-off" approach towards tackling COVID-19 had not only distressed colleagues but also violated the Hippocratic oath. 

In March 2022, Ladapo recommended that healthy children in Florida not be vaccinated against COVID-19; thus, Florida became the first state to contradict relevant guidelines by the CDC and the American Academy of Pediatrics. Experts cited by Ladapo disagreed with his stance and accused him of cherry-picking their work. In October 2022, Ladapo cited an anonymous non-peer-reviewed analysis — claiming high cases of cardiac-related deaths among men who took mRNA COVID-19 vaccines — to suggest that men aged 18 to 39 not be vaccinated. Medical professionals rejected his analysis as methodologically flawed and unscientific; David Gorski noted that it was the first time in American history that a "state government weaponized bad science to spread anti-vaccine disinformation as official policy." In January 2023, the Faculty Council of the University of Florida Health concluded upon an investigation that Ladapo's recommendation was based on "careless and contentious research practice" and might have violated the university policies on research integrity.  

Across 2022, Ladapo has also focused on opposing transgender health care, accusing professional organizations such as the American Academy of Pediatrics and the Endocrine Society of being politically motivated to support such causes. He opposes gender-affirming care and counseling, hormonal therapies, related medications for transgender and nonbinary children and teenagers, and social-transition tools such as pronoun and name changes.

On March 10, 2023, Ladapo was publicly rebuked by the CDC and FDA for disseminating vaccine misinformation in response to a letter he wrote to the agencies which had misinterpreted data from the Vaccine Adverse Event Reporting System (VAERS).

References

External links 
 Joseph Ladapo, Curriculum vitae, UCLA Health (10 July 2021)

21st-century American physicians
COVID-19 conspiracy theorists
Florida Department of Health
State cabinet secretaries of Florida
Wake Forest University alumni
Harvard Medical School alumni
Harvard Kennedy School alumni
University of California, Los Angeles faculty
University of Florida faculty
Nigerian emigrants to the United States
Year of birth missing (living people)
Living people
Physicians from Florida